Hope Gap is a locality in the Mid North region of South Australia. It is north of Snowtown on the western side of the Augusta Highway. Hope Gap is named for a gap (previously known as Hope's Gap) in the Barunga Range on its western side which is traversed by the road from Lake View to Mundoora.

Hope Gap includes the northern part of the Snowtown Wind Farm.

See also
 Clements Gap
 Barunga Gap

References

Towns in South Australia